Powell v Moody is English case law, often used for the settlement of civil claims brought as the result of road traffic collisions. The case was decided in 1966.

A recent case (Davis v Schrogin 2006) is lately quoted as a defence to Powell v Moody. However, Davis v Schrogin does not supersede Powell v Moody and that the latter is still considered in out-of-court settlements.  This is because in the case of Davis v Schogin, the car driver emerged from a line of traffic to make a U-turn and not from a side road.

Case
The plaintiff was riding a motorbike along a road and came across a stationary line of traffic consisting of vehicles two abrest.  The plaintiff proceeded along the offside overtaking the stationary vehicles.  The defendant came out of a side road in a car through a gap in the traffic intending to turn right in the opposite direction to the traffic and the plaintiff's travel.  The defendant was signalled by the driver of a milk-tanker to proceed and as the defendant inched out he was hit by the plaintiff.

Judgement
The judge ruled that both parties were to blame but attributed 80% of the blame to the plaintiff.

Significance
The case is often quoted as an proving example of the liability incurred by motorcyclists when 'making a lane' and proceeding alongside traffic.  As this is an operation fraught with potential hazards anyone undertaking it incurs liability for anything which may happen irrespective of whether they have right-of-way.

References

1966 in British law
English tort case law
1966 in case law